Gravdal is a village in Vestvågøy Municipality in Nordland county, Norway. It is located on the island of Vestvågøya in the central part of the Lofoten archipelago, north of the Arctic Circle. Historically, the village was the administrative centre of the old Buksnes municipality which existed from 1838 until 1963.

Gravdal has gone from being a small trade center on the island to becoming mostly a residential village. Today, there is a grocery store, kindergarten, primary school, and several small businesses. Nordland Hospital and the Nordland School of Fisheries are both located in Gravdal and have been major economic centers of Gravdal for a very long time, along with the Gravdal port.  The more than 100-year-old Buksnes Church, which was built in 1905 in dragestil style, is located in the village.

Media gallery

References

Vestvågøy
Villages in Nordland
Populated places of Arctic Norway